Radioimmunoguided surgery is a procedure that uses radioactive substances to locate tumors so that they can be removed by surgery.

References

External links

Surgical procedures and techniques